Rudolph Glacier  is a glacier flowing into Andvord Bay south of Moser Glacier, on the west coast of Graham Land. Charted by the Belgian Antarctic Expedition under Gerlache, 1897–99. Named by the United Kingdom Antarctic Place-Names Committee (UK-APC) in 1960 for Paul Rudolph, German mathematical optician who designed the first anastigmatic camera lens, introduced by Zeiss in 1889, and the "Tessar" lens, introduced by Zeiss in 1902.

Glaciers of Danco Coast